United Arab Emirates participated in the 1998 Asian Games held in Bangkok, Thailand from 6 December 1998 to 20 December 1998. United Arab Emirates won a silver and a bronze medal and finished at 28th position in a medal table.

References

Nations at the 1998 Asian Games
1998